Rutidea nigerica is a species of plant in the family Rubiaceae. It is found in Benin, Cameroon, and Nigeria. Its natural habitat is subtropical or tropical moist lowland forests. It is threatened by habitat loss.

References

Rutidea
Vulnerable plants
Taxonomy articles created by Polbot
Taxa named by Diane Mary Bridson